Nanayakkarapathirage Martin Perera, commonly known as Dr. N. M. Perera (Sinhala එන්.එම්.පෙරේරා ; 6 June 1904 – 14 August 1979), was one of the leaders of the Sri Lankan Trotskyist Lanka Sama Samaja Party (LSSP). He was the first Trotskyist to become a cabinet minister. He served two terms as Minister of Finance and Leader of the Opposition, as well as one term as the Mayor of Colombo.

Early life and education
Born to Nanayakkarapathirage Abraham Perera who was a rent collector at 36 St Joseph 's Street, in Grandpass, Colombo and Johana Perera. He was the fifth of nine siblings that was made up of five boys and four girls.

Perera started his schooling in the vernacular section of St. Joseph's School, Grandpass and was later was admitted to the English section. From there he spent a year at the Cathedral Boys’ School, Mutwal a branch school of S. Thomas' College, Mutwal, then known as Cathedral Boys School, Mutwal. In 1919, he entered S. Thomas' College, Mount Lavinia and left in 1922 to join Ananda College. At Ananda he played cricket for the college team.

From 1922 to 1927, he studied at the University College, Colombo where he was a contemporary of J. R. Jayewardene. Perera graduated with a BSc degree from the University of London External System. Thereafter he left to the United Kingdom, to enter the London School of Economics in 1927. He was in London from 1927 to 1933, where he studied under Professor Harold Laski, gaining his PhD with the thesis on the Constitution of the German Weimar Republic. This was followed by a further comparative study, of the Constitutions of the UK, United States, France and Germany; which gained him a DSc from the University of London. Perera was the first Ceylonese to gain a degree of Doctor of Science from the University of London.

Formation of the Lanka Sama Samaja Party
Perera returned to Ceylon in 1933. The work done by Perera (as a member of the Suriya-Mal Movement) in the Kegalle district during the malaria epidemic of 1934 and during the subsequent floods gained for him the support of the poor and caste-oppressed people of the area, who called him Parippu Mahathmaya after the dhal (or parippu) he distributed as relief supplies. In 1935 Perera was one of the founder members of the LSSP and played an leading role in the parties Trotskyist actives between 1936 and 1940.

State Council of Ceylon
In 1936 he contested the Ruwanwella constituency, which at the time was the Thun Korale areas of Yatiyantota, Ruwanwella and Dereniyagala and parts of the present Galigamuwa electoral division, from the LSSP. His opponent was the incumbent Molamure Kumarihamy of the Meedeniya Walauwa, the feudal manor which had tremendous power over the poor people of the Sabaragamuwa area at the time. He was to hold this seat, or its Yatiyantota portion on division, continuously until 1977. Following his election, he and Philip Gunawardena, the other LSSP member of the State Council, used it as a platform voice the party's policy and objectives for complete independence from Britten, where as the Ceylon National Congress was advocating self-rule. In 1937, he formed the Ratmalana Railway Workers' Union and was the LSSP delegate to the Indian National Congress session.

Anti-war activity and imprisonment
With the outbreak of World War II, the Board of Ministers declared its support to the British government. The LSSP opposed the move, claiming that it was an imperialist war and organized protest. In 1939, Perera formed the All-Ceylon Estate Workers' Union and lead a militant strike at Mooloya Plantation in January 1940. Perera and Gunawardana voted against the war budget in the State Council, On protests of the planters, the Governor of Ceylon declared LSSP activity against war effort as subversive and order the police to arrest the leaders of the LSSP. On 18 June 1940, N.M. Perera, Philip Gunawardena, and Colvin R de Silva were arrested by the police with Edmund Samarakkody being arrested the following day, but Leslie Goonewardene evaded arrest. The LSSP called for a gathering to protest the arrest and carried out a protest march which was dispersed by the police with a baton charge and followed by arrests. LSSP leaders were detained at the Welikada Prison but was later transferred to the Bogambara Prison after it was suspected that they were planning a hunger strike. On 5 April 1942 during the Easter Sunday Raid, Perera along with several other imprisoned LSSP members escaped from prison. He was smuggled into Bombay in July 1942 and worked with the Bolshevik-Leninist Party of India, Ceylon and Burma (BLPI) in that country's independence struggle. He was arrested in Bombay in July 1943 and was deported to Ceylon where he was sentenced to six months’ rigorous imprisonment by the Magistrates Court of Kandy for prison escape and was imprisoned in Badulla for the duration of the war. He was released in 1945.

Leader of the LSSP
During the war the LSSP had several divisions. With the first taking place in 1940, with the split of the ro-Moscow fraction led by S. A. Wickremasinghe, M. G. Mendis, Pieter Keuneman and A. Vaidialingam. This was followed by a second slit over N. M. Perera and Philip Gunawardena opposition to merger into the Bolshevik-Leninist Party of India, Ceylon and Burma, resulting in the formation the Workers' Opposition. After the war this faction, reconstructed the LSSP as an independent political party with N. M. Perera becoming its leader.

Trade union activities
Perera was the president of the All Ceylon United Motor Workers' Union, and the United Corporations and Mercantile Union the Ceylon Federation of Labour (CFL). He was appointed their chief negotiator by the striking workers during the 1946 general strike.

Leader of the opposition (1947-1952)
Having lost their seats in the State Council due to their imprisonment, the LSSP contested the 1947 general elections under the new constitution. N. M. Perera was elected from Ruwanwella and the LSSP gained the 28 seats in parliament, becoming the second largest representation, making Perera the Leader of the Opposition. He opposed the Ceylon Citizenship Act. On reunification with the Bolshevik Samasamaja Party (BSSP), he remained with the LSSP when the Viplavakari Lanka Sama Samaja Party (VLSSP) split off under Philip Gunawardena. He served as opposition leader until fresh elections were called in 1952. In the 1952 general elections, he was re-elected, but the LSSP became the second largest party in the opposition and S. W. R. D. Bandaranaike became the opposition leader.

Mayor of Colombo
In 1954, the LSSP won a string of local government elections which included nine Village Councils and three Urban Councils and the Colombo Municipal Council, where N. M. Perera was elected Mayor of Colombo, only non-United National Party-politician to win that office after 1945. He was Mayor for two years, before he was voted out of office on 28 February 1956 by the United National Party.

Leader of the opposition (1956-1959)
N. M. Perera contested the 1956 general elections, where the Sri Lanka Freedom Party of the Bandaranaike gained landslide victory over the United National Party which was reduced to eight seats in parliament. Once again N. M. Perera was elected leader of the opposition in parliament, a post he held until 1959. He was a strong opponent of the Official Language Act, and narrowly escaped death then a bomb was thrown on stage when he was addressing a crowd at the Old Town Hall.

Split in the party
He was re-elected in the 1960 March general election and the 1960 July general election from Yatiyantota and sat in the opposition. 
When LSSP was divided over possible government participation in early 1960s, Perera was the principal leader of the wing that wanted to enter into government with the Sri Lanka Freedom Party, which led to LSSP's expulsion from the Fourth International in 1964.

Minister of Finance (1964)
A short lived Coalition government was formed in 1964 known as the United Front and Perera was appointed Minister of Finance in it. He had to step down as minister when the United Front was defeated in the 1965 general elections and sat in the opposition having retained his seat in parliament.

Minister of Finance
He was reappointed as Minister of Finance in 1970, when the United Front won the 1970 general elections. He served as Minister of Finance from 10 May 1970 to 2 September 1975. Perera faced a budget deficit and first attempted to increase government tax revenue. In October 1970, he demonetized with the denominations of Rupees 50 and 100 to flush out black money. This failed to increase government tax revenue at the significant operational cost to the Central Bank. The 1971 Janatha Vimukthi Peramuna Insurrection of left-wing youths to the leftist government by surprise and was almost toppled. He initiated a program of nationalization of private property and industries.  It stunted both domestic and foreign investment in industry and development, unemployment and inflation remained unchecked. By 1974, the budget deficits of $195 million and Ceylon was facing a foreign exchange crisis. This was party due to global macro economic conditions of the such as the 1973 oil crisis as well as the results of government policies such as the Bandaranaike government's attempts to centralise the economy and implement price controls which resulted in declining revenue from coconut, rubber and tea exports and increased food-importation costs. In September 1975, N. M. Perera and other LSSP ministers were removed by Prime Minister Sirima Bandaranaike. In the 1977 general elections, which the United National Party won with a total landslide of 5/6 of the seats, the LSSP like other leftist parties suffered a complete defeat and lost all of its seats. Perera lost his parliamentary seat in Yatiyantota.

Later years
From 1977 to 1978, he served as Chairman of the Board of Control of Cricket in Sri Lanka, and worked hard to obtain test status for Sri Lanka. In 1978, he represented Sri Lanka at the United Nations Conference on Trade and Development as an adviser. He died on 14 August 1979 at the Colombo National Hospital following gall-bladder complication, aged 75 and his funeral gathered large crowds.

Personal life
He married fellow LSSP founding member and later party secretary, Selina Margaret Peiris on 6 March 1936. N. M. Perera was an avid cricket fan and a keen tennis player.

Publications
 Parliamentary Democracy (1931)
 The Case for Free Education (1944)
 External Economic Assistance (1964)
 The Economy of Ceylon: Trends and Prospects (1971)
 Critical Analysis of the New Constitution of the Sri Lanka Government (1979)

See also
Lanka Sama Samaja Party
GCSU Sri Lanka

Further reading
Dr. N.M. Perera's Policies and Achievements by Prof. B. Hewavitharana

References

External links
  Dr N.M. Perera a colossus among leaders
 'Why Implant a New System of Government?' Part I
 'Why Implant a New System of Government?' Part 2
Official Website of Lanka Sama Samaja Party
Official Website of DR.N.M. PERERA TRUST
Dr. N.M. Perera 1905 – 1979 :An honest and upright politician
 Double Doctor and only non-UNP Mayor of CMC

1904 births
1979 deaths
Alumni of Ananda College
Alumni of S. Thomas' College, Mount Lavinia
Alumni of the Ceylon University College
Alumni of the London School of Economics
Alumni of the University of London
Alumni of University of London Worldwide
Escapees from British Ceylon detention
Finance ministers of Sri Lanka
Fugitives wanted by Sri Lanka
Lanka Sama Samaja Party politicians
Leaders of the Opposition (Sri Lanka)
Mayors of Colombo
Members of the 2nd State Council of Ceylon
Members of the 1st Parliament of Ceylon
Members of the 2nd Parliament of Ceylon
Members of the 3rd Parliament of Ceylon
Members of the 4th Parliament of Ceylon
Members of the 5th Parliament of Ceylon
Members of the 6th Parliament of Ceylon
Members of the 7th Parliament of Ceylon
Prisoners and detainees of British Ceylon
Sinhalese academics
Sinhalese politicians
Sri Lankan actor-politicians
Sri Lankan independence activists
Sri Lankan politicians convicted of crimes
Sri Lankan prisoners and detainees
Sri Lankan socialists
Sri Lankan trade unionists
Sri Lankan Trotskyists